Renato Ghezze (born 30 January 1936 in Cortina d'Ampezzo) is an Italian curler.

Teams

References

External links
 

Living people
1936 births
People from Cortina d'Ampezzo
Italian male curlers